The 2013–14 Stanford Cardinal women's basketball team  represented Stanford University during the 2013–14 NCAA Division I women's basketball season. The Cardinal, led by twenty-eighth year head coach Tara VanDerveer, played their home games at the Maples Pavilion and were a members of the Pac-12 Conference. They finished the season with a 33–4 overall, 17–1 to win their twenty-fourth regular season Pac-12 title. They lost in the quarterfinals of the 2014 Pac-12 Conference women's basketball tournament to USC. They were invited to the 2014 NCAA Division I women's basketball tournament which they defeated South Dakota in the first round, Florida State in the second round, Penn State in the sweet sixteen, North Carolina in the elite eight to make their twelfth Final Four appearance. In the final four the Cardinal were defeated by the 2014 NCAA Division I women's basketball tournament champion, Connecticut.

Roster

Schedule

|-
!colspan=9 | Exhibition

|-
!colspan=9| Regular Season

|-
!colspan=9 | 2014 Pac-12 Conference women's tournament

|-
!colspan=9 | NCAA women's tournament

Source

Rankings

See also
2013–14 Stanford Cardinal men's basketball team

References

Stanford Cardinal women's basketball seasons
Stanford
NCAA Division I women's basketball tournament Final Four seasons
Stanford